"Cowboy Band" is a song recorded by American country music artist Billy Dean.  It was released in June 1994 as the first single from the album Men'll Be Boys.  The song reached #24 on the Billboard Hot Country Singles & Tracks chart.  The song was written by Jule Medders and Monty Powell.

Chart performance

References

Songs about cowboys and cowgirls
1994 singles
Billy Dean songs
Songs written by Monty Powell
Song recordings produced by Jimmy Bowen
Liberty Records singles
1994 songs